Decemtestis is a genus of trematodes in the family Opecoelidae. It has been synonymised with Allodecemtestis Hafeezullah, 1970.

Species
Decemtestis asymmetricus Wang, 1991
Decemtestis azumae (Layman, 1930) Yamaguti, 1934
Decemtestis bera Yamaguti, 1938
Decemtestis biacetabulata Srivastava, 1936 emend. Hafeezullah, 1970
Decemtestis bilqeesae (Ahmad, 1990) Cribb, 2005
Decemtestis brevicirrus Srivastava, 1936 emend. Hafeezullah, 1970
Decemtestis callionymi Yamaguti, 1934 emend. Yamaguti, 1951
Decemtestis cynoglossi Karyakarte & Yadav, 1977
Decemtestis ditrematis Yamaguti, 1934
Decemtestis dollfusi Ahmad, 1983
Decemtestis drepanai Gupta & Puri, 1982
Decemtestis fusiformis Wang, 1986
Decemtestis goniistii Yamaguti, 1938
Decemtestis johnii Shaukat & Bilqees, 2012
Decemtestis kobayashii Park, 1939
Decemtestis lutiani Wang, 1986
Decemtestis manteri Zhukov, 1970
Decemtestis marginoacetabulatus Karyakarte & Yadav, 1977
Decemtestis megacotyla Yamaguti, 1938
Decemtestis mehrai Srivastava, 1936 emend. Gupta & Jahan, 1977
Decemtestis mystusi Dhanumkumari, 1999
Decemtestis neopercis Yamaguti, 1938
Decemtestis odeningi (Ahmad, 1988) Cribb, 2005
Decemtestis pagrosomi Yamaguti, 1938
Decemtestis parapercis Yamaguti, 1959
Decemtestis pseudolabri Manter, 1954 emend. Hafeezullah, 1970
Decemtestis sillagonis Yamaguti, 1934
Decemtestis singhi Ahmad, 1983
Decemtestis skrjabini (Ahmad, 1988) Cribb, 2005
Decemtestis spari Yamaguti, 1938
Decemtestis srivastavai Gupta & Jahan, 1977
Decemtestis takanoha Yamaguti, 1951
Decemtestis varmai Gupta & Gupta, 1988

References

Opecoelidae
Plagiorchiida genera